American Yakuza is a 1993 American crime film directed by Frank Cappello and starring Viggo Mortensen, Ryo Ishibashi,  Michael Nouri, Franklyn Ajaye, Yuji Okumoto, Anzu Lawson, and Robert Forster. The screenplay by John Allen Nelson and Max Strom is based on a story by executive producer Takashige Ichise. American Yakuza was released in the United States on December 22, 1993.

Premise
American FBI agent Nick Davis works undercover, rising through the ranks of the Yakuza to infiltrate their operations. Adopted by the Tendo crime family, he is entangled with the Italian Mafia, the Yakuza, and the FBI. In the end he must decide what is most important to him.

Cast
Viggo Mortensen as Nick Davis / David Brandt
Ryo Ishibashi as Shuji Sawamoto
Michael Nouri as Dino Campanela
Franklyn Ajaye as Sam
Yuji Okumoto as Kazuo
Anzu Lawson as Yuko
Robert Forster as Littman
Nicky Katt as Vic
John Fujioka as Isshin Tendo
James Taenaka as Taka
Toni Naples as Mrs. Campanela
Saiko Isshiki as Aya
Fritz Mashimo as Okazaki
Joey Ciccone as Rudy

Critical response
TV Guide wrote that director Frank Cappello did "an adequate job of weaving a relatively intricate storyline together, while delivering numerous explosive, action-packed sequences".  The reviewer said that Viggo Mortensen excelled in his performance, and Ryo Ishibashi was impressive in his role. They concluded that overall, American Yakuza "is a surprisingly powerful portrayal of the loyalties that exist in the underworld, where violence and betrayal are a way of life."

Reviewer Anton Bitel wrote after considering Viggo Mortensen's acting in this 1993 film, and how he is better remembered now as Aragorn in the Lord of the Rings films, this one "will leave viewers wondering why Mortensen's talents were not generally recognized a lot earlier."  He also notes that one of the film's ironies is that when the Mafia takes on the Yakuza in the film and "boast of their 'American drive and know-how'", they forget the similarities in that a century earlier they were just as eager as the Yakuza "to get a foothold in this country".  Bitel feels that "American Yakuza is in effect 'The Godfather: the next Generation' – an immigrant saga of family, blood and assimilation that just happens to be set in the world of organized crime."  He found flaws in that parts of the film "have the look of a rock video" and overall suffers from needing a larger budget. He concludes with praise for the acting, twisting plotline, and the carefully restrained violence.

References

External links

1990s crime action films
1993 directorial debut films
1993 martial arts films
American crime action films
American martial arts films
Yakuza films
1990s English-language films
1990s American films
1990s Japanese films